Ritondo Sport Clube de Malanje is an Angolan sports club from the city of Malanje, in the namesake province.
The team last played in the Gira Angola, the Angolan 2nd division championship, in 2012.

Achievements
Angolan League: 0

Angolan Cup: 0

Angolan SuperCup: 0

Gira Angola: 0

Provincial League: 2 (2009, 2010)

League & Cup Positions

Manager history

Players

See also
Girabola

References

External links
 Girabola.com Profile

Association football clubs established in 1978
Football clubs in Angola
Sports clubs in Angola
1978 establishments in Angola